Impatientinum is a genus of true bugs belonging to the family Aphididae.

The species of this genus are found in Europe.

Species:
 Impatientinum americanum Remaudière, 1981
 Impatientinum asiaticum Nevsky, 1929

References

Aphididae